John Fulton (31 March 1849 – 11 November 1908) was a New Zealand cricketer. He played first-class cricket for Otago and Taranaki between 1867 and 1883.

Fulton was born at Aligarh in British India in 1849. His brother, Frederick Fulton also played for Otago. The politician and cricketer James Fulton was his uncle, and Brigadier-General Harry Fulton was his cousin.

References

External links
 

1849 births
1908 deaths
New Zealand cricketers
Otago cricketers
Taranaki cricketers
Cricketers from Uttar Pradesh
19th-century sportsmen
West Coast cricketers